Christian Louis may refer to:

 Christian Louis I, Duke of Mecklenburg (1623–1692)
 Christian Louis, Count of Waldeck (1635–1706)
 Christian Louis, Duke of Brunswick-Lüneburg (1622–1665)
 Duke Christian Louis of Mecklenburg (1912–1996)
 Christian Louis de Massy (born 1949), son of Princess Antoinette of Monaco

See also
 Christian Ludwig (disambiguation)